was a Japanese writer, scientist, and engineer who won a race around the world in 1928. He wrote many books, most notably Prince of the Air: Around the World in 33 Days, and is sometimes called the Pioneer of Efficiency Management in Japan. He was one of the first successful professional business consultants in Japan. Araki managed to meet with two prominent industrial engineers and industrial psychologists, Lillian Gilbreth and Harrington Emerson.  Toichiro had three daughters, Keiko, Nobuko, and Aiko.

In 1945, Japanese  military  police arrested Toichiro Araki  on the  pretext of being a spy.

References

External links

1895 births
1977 deaths
Japanese writers